is a Japanese former swimmer. He competed in the men's 100 metre backstroke at the 1956 Summer Olympics.

References

External links
 

1937 births
Living people
Japanese male backstroke swimmers
Olympic swimmers of Japan
Swimmers at the 1956 Summer Olympics
Place of birth missing (living people)
Asian Games medalists in swimming
Asian Games silver medalists for Japan
Swimmers at the 1958 Asian Games
Medalists at the 1958 Asian Games
20th-century Japanese people